Friedrich Heinrich Hugo Windischmann (13 December 1811 in Aschaffenburg  23 August 1861 in Munich) was a German orientalist, exegete and Catholic leader.

Biography 
Son of the philosopher Karl Joseph Hieronymus Windischmann, he studied philosophy, classical philology, and Sanskrit at Bonn, theology at Bonn and Munich, and Armenian with the Mekhitarists in Venice. After receiving a doctorate in theology at Munich on 2 January 1836, he was ordained as a priest on the following 13 March; seven months later he became vicar of the cathedral and secretary of Archbishop Gebsattel of Munich. In 1838 he was professor-extraordinary of canon law and New Testament exegesis at Freising, but resigned when appointed canon of the cathedral in 1839.

In 1842 he was chosen a member of the Royal Bavarian Academy of Sciences and in 1846 became Vicar-General of Munich. He accompanied Archbishop Reisach to the episcopal conference at Würzburg in 1848, and was with him in Rome when the dogma of the Immaculate Conception was defined in 1854. When Reisach was created cardinal and took up his residence in Rome, Windischmann became a simple Canon on 27 August 1856. His defence of the papal and ecclesiastical rights against the frequent encroachments of the State often brought him in conflict with the civil authorities.

Windischmann was very well-versed in the Armenian and Old Persian languages, and in the various Sanskrit dialects.

Published works
Sancara sive de theologumenis Vedanticorum (Bonn, 1839)
Ueber den Somacultus der Arier in Abhandlungen der münchener Akademie (1846)
Ursagen der arischen Völker (Origins of the Aryan Races; ib., 1853)
Die persische Anahita oder Anaitis (ib., 1856)
"Mithra" in Abhandlungen fur die Kunde des Morgenlandes (1857)
a posthumous work, Zoroastrische Studien (Munich, 1863)
Vindiciae petrinae (Ratisborn, 1863), a defence of the Epistles of St. Peter and his coming to Rome, directed against Baur and his school
Erklärung des Briefes an die Galater (Mainz, 1843), an excellent explanation of St. Paul's Letter to the Galatians

References
 cites:
STRODL, Friedrich H. H. Windischmann (Munich, 1862);

1811 births
1861 deaths
German orientalists
19th-century German Catholic theologians
19th-century German male writers
German male non-fiction writers